Double C2-like domain-containing protein alpha is a protein that in humans is encoded by the DOC2A gene.

There are at least two protein isoforms of the Double C2 protein,  namely alpha (DOC2A) and beta (DOC2B), which contain two C2-like domains.  DOC2A and DOC2B are encoded by different genes; these genes are at times confused with the unrelated DAB2 gene which was initially named DOC-2. DOC2A is mainly expressed in brain and is suggested to be involved in Ca(2+)-dependent neurotransmitter release.

Interactions 

DOC2A has been shown to interact with UNC13B and UNC13A.

References

Further reading